Jane Kurson is an American film editor known for her work on titles like Beetlejuice and Hot Shots!

Selected filmography 

 Endless Bummer (2009)
 Graduation (2007)
 Perfect Opposites (2004)
 Monster (2003)
 Thank Heaven (2001)
 It Had to Be You (2000)
 Welcome to Hollywood (1998)
 Bed of Roses (1996)
 Bad Girls (1994)
 Amos & Andrew (1993)
 Love Field (1992)
 Hot Shots! (1991)
 Immediate Family (1989)
 Beetlejuice (1988)
 Happy New Year (1987)
 The Karate Kid Part II (1986)
 Neighbors (1981)
 Don't Go in the House (1979)

References 

American film editors
American women film editors
Year of birth missing (living people)
Living people
21st-century American women